Rebecca McClanahan is a former Democratic Representative of the second district of the Missouri House of Representatives, including parts of Putnam, Sullivan, and Adair counties. She was defeated in the 2010 general election by Zachary Wyatt. McClanahan is a lifelong nurse and educator. In 2012 she ran as a Democratic candidate for the newly created Missouri House 3rd district, but was defeated by Republican and former state representative Nate Walker.

Political career
During the 94th General Assembly regular session, McClanahan sponsored House Bill 627, which "requires the installation of carbon monoxide detection devices in certain residential properties." This bill received a hearing in the House Committee on Crime Prevention and Public Safety, but was not passed.  This bill was filed again in 2008. Rebecca McClanahan also cosponsored over 30 other bills and one proposed constitutional amendment.

2008
McClanahan was challenged for her seat by Greentop resident Thom Van Vleck, whom she defeated by 1,457 votes.  The 2008 race was remarkable for the large sum of money spent.

2010
McClanahan was defeated for the 2nd district seat by United States Air Force veteran, Zachary Wyatt of Novinger. Wyatt is a former intern for United States Senator Kit Bond.  The 2010 campaign was remarkable for the robocalls placed into the district.  The calls displayed on Caller ID as originating from the Adair County Ambulance District, however District officials disavowed the calls.  McClanahan's campaign speculated the calls originated from Wyatt and his "anonymous supporters".  Wyatt and his campaign denied any prior knowledge of the calls and condemned them, describing them as "back-room politics" and further called on McClanahan "to apologize for her false accusations.". Later Wyatt said: "I knew my team was not behind it and I believe the voters of the district knew that was not my style and they really didn't pay attention to that information because they knew I would never do anything like that, and I wouldn't." Evidence later showed that the Missouri State Republican Party was responsible for the robocalls and paid Survey St. Louis LLC $2,135.25 for the service. The donation was listed in support of Zachary Wyatt. Similar purchases were made by the Missouri Republican Party in support of four other State Representative candidates: John W. Cauthorn, Jay Houghton, Craig Redmon, and Lindell Shumake

2012
Following Zachary Wyatt's withdrawal from the race for the newly created Missouri House 3rd District in April, 2012, McClanahan announced her intent to seek the position and return to state government. She was unopposed in the August, 2012 Democratic primary. Controversy over the use of mail advertising arose in the days leading up to the November general election. McClanahan felt that mailers sent out on behalf of her opponent, Nate Walker, by the House Republican Campaign Committee and the Missouri Republican State Committee unfairly portrayed her position on issues and voting record. McClanahan's campaign was also accused of unauthorized usage of a likeness and quote in one of her mailers. Retired Marine Corps Major Duane Crawford, a well-known Republican and popular former teacher/coach from Unionville, Missouri, claimed that McClanahan did not have authorization to recycle his image and a quote he gave when he supported McClanahan in her 2008 campaign for the Missouri House 2nd District seat. Said Crawford "I am very upset about this situation. I did not give her express permission." and "When I saw it (the mailer) I was completely shocked. I was embarrassed." Crawford said he told a McClanahan campaign worker that he wanted nothing to do with politics in 2012. However McClanahan said she was never informed of the request, and issued a public apology to Crawford. On November 6, 2012 McClanahan suffered her second straight defeat as she lost to Republican Nate Walker by over 2,000 votes.

Personal life
Rebecca Payne McClanahan lives in Kirksville, Missouri with her husband Marvin, a retired long-time radio host at KIRX and KTUF.  They have two sons, Andrew and Bryan.  Andrew lives in Alabama with his wife Astrid, and Bryan lives in Columbia, Missouri. She was born October 23, 1951 in Moberly, Missouri. She was a professor of nursing at Truman State University and a mental health nursing consultant. She taught at Truman for over 30 years, after graduating from Northeast Missouri State University, which is now Truman, with her Bachelor of Science in Nursing in 1975. She went on to earn her Master's degree in Nursing from the University of Missouri in 1982 and then her Doctoral Candidacy at the University of Kansas. Following her defeat in the 2010 election, McClanahan took a position in early 2011 as director of Missouri Healthcare for All, a lobbyist group for healthcare reform and other health issues.

Electoral history

References

External links
Official Missouri House Page
Official Website

1951 births
Living people
People from Moberly, Missouri
People from Kirksville, Missouri
Truman State University alumni
University of Kansas alumni
University of Missouri alumni
Truman State University faculty
Missouri Democrats
Women state legislators in Missouri
American women academics
21st-century American women